Denise Majette (born 1955), American politician
Tiffany Majette, known as Orion Sun, American singer, songwriter, multi-instrumentalist and producer 
Theo Majette, member of Calgary Stampeders Canadian Football roster